Seosaeng-myeon is a myeon of Ulju County, Ulsan, South Korea. As of 2022, its total population is 8,650.

History 
During the time of Silla Kingdom, this region is the administrative center of Saengseoryang-gun (생서량군,生西良郡), which governed the area of today's Seosaeng-myeon, Onsan-eup and Onyang-eup. In 757, Saengseoryang-gun was renamed Dongan-gun (동안군,東安郡), and Upung-hyeon (우풍현,虞風縣, present day Ungchon-myeon and Yangsan-si's Ungsang region) was placed under Dongan as a subsidiary county.

During the Goryeo dynasty, Dongan-gun was downgraded to a prefecture and incorporated into Heungryobu (흥려부, present day Ulsan).

In the early Joseon dynasty, a naval manhoyeong (군만호영,萬戶營, division with 10,000 soldiers) stationed in Seosaengpo (서생포,西生浦) in the eastern part of the region. Following the Japanese invasions of Korea in 1592, the commander of the manhoyeong was promoted to the rank of naval dongcheom Jeoljesa (동첨절제사, 同僉節制使). In the 32nd year of King Gojong's reign (1895), as the navy was being abolished, the region was organized into Seosaeng-myeon and put under the direct jurisidction of dongcheom Jeoljesa.

On September 24, 1906, parts of Onnam-myeon and parts of Seosarng-myeon were incorporated into Oenam-myeon of Yangsan-gun. The myeon office was located in Yeonsan-ri (now Myeongsan-ri).

On April 1, 1912, Oenam-myeon was transferred from Yangsan-gun to Ulsan-gun.

On April 1, 1914, nearby Oenam-myeon, Hwama-dong and Suma-dong of Onnam-myeon were integrated into Seosaengmyoen, which was also reorganized into 10 villages. The myeon government was located in Seosaeng-ri, and later moved to Sinam-ri.

On April 25, 1952, local election was held and the first 12 township councilors of Seosang-myeon were elected.

On September 1, 1961, the Seosaeng-myeon Council was forcibly dissolved by the military regime of Park Chung-hee.

On June 1, 1962, Seosaeng-myeon was integrated into Ulju-gun.

On January 1, 1963, Seosaeng-myeon was incorporated into Dongnae-gun.

On January 1, 1973, Dongnae-gun was abolished and incorporated into Yangsan-gun.

On Februart 15, 1983, Seosang-myeon was transferred back to Ulju-gun.

On January 1, 1991, Ulju-gun was renamed Ulsan-gun.

On January 1, 1995, Ulsan-gun was incorporated into Ulsan-si.

On July 15, 1997, Ulsan-si was promoted to Ulsan Metropolitan City.

Administrative divisions 
Seosaeng-myeon consists of 10 legal villages, 21 administrative villages, and 60 classes. The seat of government is Shinam-ri.

Education

Elementary school 

 Myeongsan Elementary School (명산초등학교)
 Seosaeng Elementary School (서생초등학교)
 Seongdong Elementary School (성동초등학교)

Middle school 

 Seosaeng Middle School (서생중학교)

University 

 International Nuclear Graduate School (국제원자력대학원대학교)

Transportation

Road 
National Route 31 is the main road in Seosaeng-myeon.

Railroad 
Donghae Line passes through the western part of Seosaeng-myeon in the Seosaeng station.

References 

Towns and townships in Ulsan